Egardus (also Engardus or Johannes Echgaerd) was a European Medieval composer of ars subtilior. Almost no information survives about his life, and only three of his works are known. A certain "Johannes Ecghaerd", who held chaplaincies in Bruges and Diksmuide, may be a possible match for Egardus. The extant works—a canon and two Glorias—appear to be less complex than music by mid-century composers, possibly because they date from either very early or very late in Egardus' career.

Biography

Little is known with certainty about his life.  The enigma of his biography stems from a difficulty in knowing whether he was Flemish or Italian.  A northern origin is suggested by his name, a copy of one of his works in a Flemish manuscript, and a possible citation of his music by Thomas Fabri.  But with only one other exception, all of his works are found in Northern Italian manuscripts, and that exception, a Polish manuscript, has strong Italian connections.  The most important biographical research on the composer was conducted by Reinhard Strohm, who notes that it was more common for Northern works (and composers) to travel to Italy than the opposite.

Strohm identifies a "Magister Johannes Ecghaerd" appointed as succentor of St Donatian's Cathedral (Sint-Donaaskathedraal) in Bruges in 1370 as a possible match for the composer. This appointment suggests to Strohm that Echgaerd would have been born by or before 1340. Strohm also finds connections to a work by Thomas Fabri, a Dutch composer, in the text of Furnos reliquisti, an unlikely coincidence if they were not working in close proximity to each other. Johannes Egardus held chaplaincies in Diksmuide and Bruges.  The number of his pieces in Paduan manuscripts suggested to Strohm that he may have been resident there. Nino Pirrotta had suggested that he may have been one of the musicians in the papal court of Bologna c.1410.  However, Pirrotta's evidence was based on the position of Egardus's works within the manuscript Mod A—a connection between manuscript and court now considered more tenuous, and not from the lists of singers in the Italian papal chapels: lists from which Egardus is absent.

Works
Only three works by Egardus survive.  A canon, Furnos reliquisti quare; Equum est et salutare is found in a single source, Mod A (Modena, Biblioteca Estense e Universitaria alpha.M.5.24).  His other two works have a somewhat wider distribution.  The Gloria with the trope "Spiritus et Alme" appears in three sources, Utrecht, Universiteitsbibliotheek 1846 (olim 37, independently discovered by Schmid and Strohm) and two sources from Padua, Biblioteca Universitaria: MSS Ba 2.2.a (formerly 1225, part of Pad D) and 1475 (part of Pad A).  Both of the Paduan sources originally come from the Paduan abbey of Santa Giustina.  An untroped Gloria appears in five independent sources: Warsaw, Biblioteka Narodowa, MS III.8054 (olim Biblioteka Krasiński 52, commonly called Kras.) f. 204v-205r, Mod A f. 21v-22r, a collection of sources in Grottaferrata and at Dartmouth College (f. Dv-4r), Padua Ba 2.2.a (1225), f. 1v, and, recently identified, in Udine, Archivio di Stato framm. 22 recto (part of Cividale A).  In the Warsaw source, the work is labeled "Opus Egardi."  In Mod A, "Egardus" is used.  In no other source of this work is there an attribution.  Strohm notes that Egardus's music is less complex than other mid-century composers, but this lack of complexity can either be attributed to an early date for its composition, contemporaneous with Philippe de Vitry, or a far later date, just prior to Johannes Ciconia).

Editions of music
Additional editions are listed in the critical notes of the Polyphonic Music of the Fourteenth Century editions:

Fischer, Kurt von and F. Alberto Gallo, editors. Italian Sacred and Ceremonial Music, Polyphonic Music of the Fourteenth Century 12 (Monaco: Éditions de l'Oiseau-Lyre, 1976), p. 21 (untroped Gloria).
Fischer, Kurt von and F. Alberto Gallo, editors. Italian Sacred and Ceremonial Music, Polyphonic Music of the Fourteenth Century 13 (Monaco: Éditions de l'Oiseau-Lyre, 1987), p. 90 (Gloria, "Spiritus et Alme"), 214 (Furnos reliquisti).

Notes

References
Cuthbert, Michael Scott. "Trecento Fragments and Polyphony Beyond the Codex" (Ph.D. Dissertation: Harvard University, 2006), chapter 2.Text
Di Bacco, Giuliano and John Nádas, "Zacara e i suoi colleghi italiani nella cappella papale," in Antonio Zacara da Teramo e il suo tempo, edited by Francesco Zimei (Lucca: Libreria Musicale Italiana (LIM), 2004), .
Nosow, Robert. "Egardus" in The New Grove Dictionary of Music and Musicians second edition (2001) and in Grove Music Online , accessed 15 April 2007.
Pirrotta, Nino.  "Il codice estense lat. 568 e la musica francese in Italia al principio del '400, Atti della Reale Accademia di Scienze, Lettere ed Arti di Palermo ser. IV, vol. V, pt. 2 (1944–45).
Schmid, Bernhold. "Zur Rekonstruktion einer Gloria-Motette von Engardus in den Paduaner Fragmenten," Die Musikforschung 38 (1985), .
Stone, Anne, The Manuscript Modena, Biblioteca Estense a.M.5.24 (ModA): Commentary (Lucca: Libreria Musicale Italiana (LIM), 2005).
Strohm, Reinhard. "Magister Egardus and other Italo-Flemish contacts," in L'Ars nova italiana del Trecento 6 (Certaldo: Centro di Studio L'ars nova italiana, 1992), pp. 41–68.
Fischer, Kurt von. "Egardus (Engardus)," The New Grove Dictionary of Music and Musicians (1980), VI, .

External links
Engardus on the La Trobe University "Music of the Fourteenth Century" site

Belgian male classical composers
Flemish composers
Musicians from Bruges
Year of birth unknown
Year of death unknown
Medieval male composers
Ars subtilior composers